William Kaiser Van Pelt (March 10, 1905 – June 2, 1996) was a Republican member of the United States House of Representatives from Wisconsin.

Born in Glenbeulah, Wisconsin, his family moved to Fond du Lac, Wisconsin when he was a youth.
Van Pelt was elected to serve Wisconsin's 6th District in the 82nd United States Congress and was reelected to the six succeeding congresses as well serving from January 3, 1951, till January 3, 1965. He lost his reelection bid to the 89th Congress losing out to John A. Race. Van Pelt voted in favor of the Civil Rights Acts of 1957 and 1960, but voted against the Civil Rights Act of 1964 and the 24th Amendment to the U.S. Constitution.

Van Pelt owned City Fuel Company and was involved in the Republican Party. After his time in Congress Van Pelt once again resided in Fond Du Lac until his death on June 2, 1996.

References

External links

1905 births
1996 deaths
Politicians from Fond du Lac, Wisconsin
Businesspeople from Wisconsin
Republican Party members of the United States House of Representatives from Wisconsin
20th-century American businesspeople
20th-century American politicians
People from Glenbeulah, Wisconsin